Hydrotaea militaris is a species of fly in the family Muscidae.

References

Further reading

External links

 Diptera.info

Muscidae
Muscomorph flies of Europe
Insects described in 1826
Taxa named by Johann Wilhelm Meigen